CD Vision is a Bangladeshi record label. It is also a film production house produce content including - short film, drama, showbiz news, telefilm, fiction, advertisement, music video and documentary. The owner of the company is Mahbub Alam.

History
CD Vision was established by Mahbub Alam. The YouTube channel crossed 1 lac subscribers and received Silver Button award from YouTube and ICT National Award.

See also
 List of Bangladeshi record labels

References

External links
 

Bangladeshi record labels
Record label distributors